Juuso Walli (born July 3, 1996) is a Finnish professional ice hockey defenceman playing for Ässät of Liiga.

Walli made his Liiga debut for Ässät during the 2015–16 season and played 94 games for the team until 2018. He had a loan spell with SaPKo of Mestis in the 2016–17 season, winning the league championship with the team.

Walli joined Iisalmen Peli-Karhut in December 2018 on a three-game contract before finishing the season with KOOVEE. On May 28, 2019, Walli returned to SaPKo.

On July 31, 2020, Walli re-joined Ässät after a two-year absence.

References

External links

1996 births
Living people
Ässät players
Finnish ice hockey defencemen
Iisalmen Peli-Karhut players
KOOVEE players
SaPKo players
Sportspeople from Tampere
20th-century Finnish people
21st-century Finnish people